Queen's Theater is a theater in Ganta, Liberia. It is one of the few theaters in Liberia and is a tourist destination in Ganta.

References 

Theatres in Liberia
Nimba County